Local elections were held in Turkey on 25 March 1984. In the elections, both the mayors and the local parliaments were elected. The figures presented below are the results of the local parliament elections.

Results

Provincial assemblies

Metropolitan center mayors

Mayor of other centers

References

Local elections in Turkey
Local